Bulbophyllum nematopodum, commonly known as the green cowl orchid, is a species of epiphytic or lithophytic orchid that has small, flask-shaped pseudobulbs pressed against the surface on which it grows. Each pseudobulb has roots at its base, a single shiny, fleshy leaf and a single cream-coloured flower with red spots on its top. It grows on trees and rocks in rainforest and is endemic to tropical North Queensland.

Description
Flowering occurs from September to November.

Taxonomy and naming
Bulbophyllum nematopodum was first formally described in 1873 by Ferdinand von Mueller who published the description in Fragmenta phytographiae Australiae from a specimen collected by John Dallachy near Rockingham Bay. The specific epithet (nematopodum) is derived from the Ancient Greek words nema meaning "thread" and pous meaning “foot”.

Distribution and habitat
The green cowl orchid grows on trees and rocks in rainforest where mists are common. It is found between the Cedar Bay National Park and the Paluma Range National Park.

References

nematopodum
Orchids of Queensland
Endemic orchids of Australia
Plants described in 1873
Taxa named by Ferdinand von Mueller